Andrew Macdonald (born 1966) is a Scottish film producer, best known for his collaborations with screenwriter John Hodge and director Danny Boyle, including Shallow Grave (1994), Trainspotting (1996), The Beach (2000) and 28 Days Later (2002).

Life and career

Together with Duncan Kenworthy, he is also the founder of DNA Films, the production company responsible for The Parole Officer (2001), 28 Days Later (2002), Sunshine (2007), 28 Weeks Later (2007), 28 Months Later (TBA), two of which Danny Boyle directed and Alex Garland wrote.  He also produced Garland's directorial debut Ex Machina.
	
He is the brother of Oscar-winning documentary maker Kevin Macdonald. His maternal grandparents were English actress Wendy Orme and Hungarian-born British Jewish Oscar-winning filmmaker Emeric Pressburger.

Filmography

Film

As an actor

Television
Executive Producer
 Devs (2020)
 Black Narcissus (2020)
 Shōgun (TBA)

Producer
 The Making of an Englishman (1995) (Documentary)
 Hitler's Warriors (TBA) (Documentary)

References

External links
 
 
 Interview
 Interview with Andrew Macdonald on success, Sunshine and his sibling Kevin at Eye For Film

Film people from Glasgow
Scottish film producers
Scottish people of English descent
British people of Hungarian-Jewish descent
Scottish people of Hungarian descent
Scottish people of Jewish descent
Scottish expatriates in the United States
People educated at Glenalmond College
1966 births
Living people